The Tasmanian leaf-toed gecko (Hemidactylus tasmani), also known commonly as Tasman's tropical house gecko, is a species of lizard in the family Gekkonidae. The species is endemic to Zimbabwe.

Etymology
The specific name, tasmani, is in honor of Father Kenneth Robert Tasman (1890–1968), who was a Jesuit priest, missionary, and herpetologist in Southern Rhodesia (now Zimbabwe).

Description

Reproduction
H. tasmani is oviparous.

References

Further reading
Hewitt J (1932). "Some New Species and Subspecies of South African Batrachians and Lizards". Annals of the Natal Museum 7 (1): 105–128. (Hemidactylus tasmani, new species).
Loveridge A (1947). "Revision of the African Lizards of the Family Gekkonidae". Bulletin of the Museum of Comparative Zoölogy at Harvard College 98: 1–469. (Hemidactylus tasmani, p. 170).
Rösler H (2000). "Kommentierte Liste der rezent, subrezent und fossil bekannten Geckotaxa (Reptilia: Gekkonomorpha)". Gekkota 2: 28–153. (Hemidactylus tasmani, p. 88). (in German).

Hemidactylus
Reptiles of Zimbabwe
Endemic fauna of Zimbabwe
Reptiles described in 1932
Taxa named by John Hewitt (herpetologist)